Crasodactylus punctatus is a species of beetle in the family Carabidae, the only species in the genus Crasodactylus.

References

Harpalinae